Pema Lingpa or Padma Lingpa (1450–1521) was a Bhutanese saint and siddha of the Nyingma school of Tibetan Buddhism. He is considered a terchen or "preeminent tertön" (discoverer of spiritual treasures) and is considered to be foremost of the "Five Tertön Kings". In the history of the Nyingma school in Bhutan, Pema Lingpa is second only in importance to Padmasambhava.

Biography

Pema Lingpa was born in Chel presently called Baribrang in Tang valley of Bumthang, part of the central Bhutanese region of Bumthang known as the “Wheel of Dharma.” His father was Lama Döndrup Zangpo of the Nyö clan, and his mother, Drogmo Pema Drolma, was bestowed with all the signs of a dakini. Their son was born among many miraculous signs. As an incarnation of the Omniscient One Drimé Ozer (Longchenpa), Pema Lingpa was extraordinary even as a child. He learned everything from reading and writing to ironwork and carpentry without receiving any instruction.

On the tenth day of the first month of autumn in a Monkey Year, Padmasambhava appeared before Pema Lingpa at the holy site of Yigé Drukma, blessed him, and placed in his hands an inventory of one hundred and eight major termas to be revealed. However, due to the karmic disposition of beings at that time, during his lifetime Pema Lingpa revealed only about half of the prophesied treasures. Nevertheless, the revealed treasures of Pema Lingpa contain the essence of all 108 treasures, which are summarized in the cycles of the three heart practices transmitted to Princess Pemasel by Guru Rinpoche: The Lama Jewel Ocean, The Union of Samantabhadra's Intentions, and The Great Compassionate One: The Lamp That Illuminates Darkness.

One well-known story of Pema Lingpa tells of his diving with a burning butter lamp into the Burning Lake in the Bumthang District of Bhutan. He told onlookers that if he was a false spirit his lamp would be extinguished. Disappearing into the bottom of the gorge and feared drowned, he emerged from the water  with a statue the size of a fist and a treasure casket tucked under one arm, and the butter lamp still burning in the other.

Pema Lingpa was highly regarded by all four of the principal schools of Tibetan Buddhism. He spent his life revealing the precious treasures of Padmasambhava, giving empowerments and teachings, meditating in isolated locations, building and restoring monasteries, and establishing a tradition that endures to this day. Moreover, Pema Lingpa prophesied that in the future he would return as Longsal Nyingpo in the pure land of Pemako, and that those connected with him would be reborn in Pemakö as his students.

He married twice. His first wife was Yum Tima (alias Sithar) and his second wife was Yum Bumdren.

Notable descendants of Pema Lingpa include the House of Wangchuck and the 6th Dalai Lama.

The Pema Lingpa lineage of empowerments, transmissions and guidance continues today through the three lines of the Body, Speech, and Mind emanations of Pema Lingpa: the Gangteng, Sungtrul, and Tukse Rinpoches, all of whom traditionally reside in Bhutan.

Emanation lineages

Traditionally, there are three main emanation lineages of Padma Lingpa recognized:
the Peling Sungtrul incarnations: The incarnation of Padma Lingpa
the Peling Thuksay incarnations: The incarnations of Padma Lingpa's son Thuksay Dawa Gyeltshen
the Gangteng Truelku or Peling Gyalse incarnations: The incarnations of Gyalse Pema Thinley; son of Thuksay Dawa Gyeltshen.
They are known as "Peling Yab-sey-sum" meaning incarnations of Father, son and grandson, who are considered to be the combined body and activity incarnations. However mistakenly many refer to three of them as incarnations of speech, mind and body.

Peling Sungtrul incarnations

The incarnations are:
Tenzin Drakpa  (1536–1597)
Kunkhyen Tsultim Dorje  (1680–1723)
Dorje Mikyō-tsal   Ngawang Kunzang Rolpai Dorje   (1725–1762)
Kunzang Tsewang  a.k.a. Tenzin Drubchog Dorje  (1763–1817)
Kunzang Tenpai Gyaltsen  (1819–1842)
Pema Tenzin  a.k.a. Kunzang Ngawang Chokyi Lodro 
Kunzang Dechen Dorje 
Tenzin Chōki Gyaltsen   (1843–1891)
Pema Ōsal Gyurme Dorje   (1930–1955)
Jigdrel Kunzang Pema Dorji  (b. 1965) – the present Peling Sungtrul or Lhalung Sungtrul Rinpoche

Peling Tukse incarnations
The incarnations are:
Tukse Dawa Gyaltsen  (b. 1499) – son of Pema Lingpa
Nyida Gyaltsen 
Nyida Longyang 
Tenzin Gyurme Dorje  (1641 – ca. 1702)
Gyurme Chogdrub Palzang  (ca. 1708–1750)
Tenzin Chokyi Nyima  (ca. 1752–1775)
Kunzang Gyurme Dorje Lungrig Chokyi Gocha  (ca. 1780 – ca. 1825)
Kunzang Zilnon Zhadpa-tsal 
Thubten Palwar  (1906–1939)
Tegchog Tenpa'i Gyaltsen  (1951–2010)

Peling Gyalse (Gangteng Tulku) incarnations

The incarnations are:
Gyalse Pema Tinley  (1564–1642)
Tenzin Lekpai Dondrup  (1645–1726)
Tinley Namgyal  a.k.a. Kunzang Pema Namgyal (d. ca. 1750)
Tenzin Sizhi Namgyal  (1761? –1796)
Orgyen Geleg Namgyal  (d. 1842?)
Orgyen Tenpai Nyima  (1873–1900?)
Orgyen Tenpai Nyinjed  
Orgyen Thinley Dorje 
Rigdzing Kunzang Padma Namgyal  (b. 1955) – the present Gangteng Tulku Rinpoche

Family lineages
Pema Lingpa's family line grew into a pre-eminent class of religious elites, known as Choje, who were pre-dominant in the Bhutanese religious and political sphere. The House of Wangchuck claims direct descent from Pema Lingpa, as do many other Himalayan religious elites.

Tamzhing Chöje
This Chöje family, with its main seat at Tamzhing Monastery, began with Pema Lingpa's son, Drakpa Gyalpo, who died without leaving an heir. The family line continued through Pema Lingpa's youngest son, Sangda.

Prakhar Zhalno

See also
House of Wangchuck

References

Citations

Works cited

Other sources

External links

Tertön Pema Lingpa’s Dharma Activities - at Gangteng Monastery, Bhutan.
TBRC P1693 Padma Lingpa - at The Tibetan Buddhist Resource Center
Pema Lingpa - at Rangjung Yeshe
The Pema Lingpa Lineage - at Yeshe Khorlo U.S.A. 	 	

1450 births
1521 deaths
15th-century lamas
16th-century lamas
Bhutanese lamas
Nyingma lamas
Place of death unknown
Tertöns
Wangchuck dynasty